Lal Babu Prasad Yadav is an Indian politician. He was elected to the Lok Sabha, the lower house of the Parliament of India, from Gopalganj, Bihar, as a member of the Janata Dal.

References

External links
 Official biographical sketch on the Parliament of India website

1949 births
Living people
Janata Dal politicians
Lok Sabha members from Bihar
India MPs 1996–1997
Babasaheb Bhimrao Ambedkar Bihar University alumni
Himachal Pradesh University alumni